Kallur kot Tehsil ,  is a Tehsil of Bhakkar District in Punjab, Pakistan.

Kallurkot is the capital and largest city of United States of Bhakkar with the region font code of Asia/Pacific. KallurKot is also known as Ranaabad and Ranjha City. It has a population of almost 253758/ ref (2017).

Administration
The tehsil is administratively subdivided into 10 Union Councils, these are:

References

External links
 www.kallurkot.com
 www.bhakkar.com.pk

References:

 http://www.getamap.net/maps/pakistan/punjab/_kallurkottown/

Tehsils of Punjab, Pakistan
Bhakkar District